Shenandoah County Farm, also known as the Shenandoah County Almshouse and Beckford Parish Glebe Farm, is a historic almshouse and poor farm located near Maurertown, Shenandoah County, Virginia. The almshouse was built in 1829, and is a large, brick Federal style institutional building.  It consists of a two-story, five bay central section flanked by one-story, eight bay, flanking wings. A nearly identical building is at the Frederick County Poor Farm. A two-story, rear kitchen wing was added about 1850.  Also on the property are the contributing stone spring house, a large modern frame barn (1952), a frame meat house (1894), a cemetery, and a portion of an American Civil War encampment site, occupied by Union troops prior to the Battle of Tom's Brook.

It was listed on the National Register of Historic Places in 1993.

It was destroyed by fire in the early morning of April 13, 2014.

References

Poor farms
Farms on the National Register of Historic Places in Virginia
Government buildings on the National Register of Historic Places in Virginia
Federal architecture in Virginia
Government buildings completed in 1829
Buildings and structures in Shenandoah County, Virginia
National Register of Historic Places in Shenandoah County, Virginia